Tepeköy is a village in Tarsus district of Mersin Province, Turkey. It is situated in the southern slopes of Toros Mountains. The population of village is 167  as of 2011.

References

Villages in Tarsus District